Un Rêve d’indépendance is a 1998 documentary film from the Democratic Republic of the Congo by Monique Mbeka Phoba.

Synopsis 
People no longer know what medical assistants were: neither the Belgians, who created this medical category during the colonization of the Belgian Congo, nor the Congolese people, who have let this part of their history sink into oblivion. Tracing the steps of her grandfather - formerly a medical assistant, now a doctor - the Congolese filmmaker uses this family history to portray her country 37 years after independence.

Awards 
 Cine Independiente, Bruselas, 1999
 Vues d'Afrique, Montreal, 2000

External links 

1998 films
Creative Commons-licensed documentary films
Democratic Republic of the Congo documentary films
1998 documentary films
Documentary films about African politics